The 12607/12608 Lalbagh Express is a Superfast express train connecting KSR Bengaluru City Jn and MGR Chennai Central. It is currently operated with train numbers 12608/12607 on a daily service basis.

Loco Link
This train is currently hauled by WAP-7 class electric locomotive maintained by Electric Loco Shed Erode, Royapuram of Southern Railways and Krishnarajapuram of South Western Railways.

Timings
This train is a daily service train with the following departures and arrivals at some of these stations:-

Coach Composition 
The train has 20 coaches. It is categorized as a "Superfast Express". The composition of this train is:

Another great vendor express in which one can mingle with passengers of various Dravidian linguistic backgrounds. Many vendors with their wares jostle for space. The Train has been named after the famous Lalbagh Botanical Garden In Bangalore

Introduction & Destinations
Lalbagh Express was introduced by the Southern Railway. At the time of introduction, the train had only one stop - Katpadi junction. But now it stops at 11 stations including Bangalore Cantonment, Krishnarajapuram, Bangarpet, Kuppam, Jolarpettai, Ambur, Vellore-Katpadi, Sholingur, Walajah road, Arakkonam and traverses the 362 km distance in 5 hours 45 min. The rake is now maintained by South Western Railway at Bangalore.

See also
 Chennai - Bengaluru Shatabdi Express
 Brindavan Express
 Chennai - Bengaluru Double Decker Express

External links
Lalbagh Route
  

Transport in Chennai
Transport in Bangalore
Named passenger trains of India
Rail transport in Karnataka
Rail transport in Tamil Nadu
Railway services introduced in 1992
Express trains in India